Kimbanseke is a municipality (commune) in the Tshangu district of Kinshasa, the capital city of the Democratic Republic of the Congo.

It is situated in the southeast of Kinshasa. Settlement in this hilled area is relatively new.

See also

References

External links
 Commune de Kimbanseke

Communes of Kinshasa
Tshangu District